Ivete Maria Dias de Sangalo (born 27 May 1972) is a Brazilian singer-songwriter, TV host, and occasional actress. She was on six albums with Banda Eva, and seven more solo albums. Sangalo is noted for her powerful voice, charisma and live performances. Her music is popular in Portugal. She has sold 25 million copies of her albums and won 4 Latin Grammy Awards

As a child, Sangalo started to sing and play guitar at the school where she studied. Her debut show happened in Ondina, Salvador in August 1992. With that show she won the Dorival Caymmi trophy, considered the Grammy of Bahia music.

Life and career

Beginnings, Banda Eva and early solo career
Ivete Sangalo was born in Juazeiro, Bahia, where she spent her childhood.  She is of paternal Spanish descent (her grandfather was born in Spain).
She started her singing career in events at school and then started singing at bars. She started to receive attention and signed with Sony Music. In 1993, Sony decided to reform the Axé group Banda Eva and she was chosen as the lead singer. Her live album with the band, Banda Eva Ao Vivo, was their best-selling album, selling over a million copies. In 1997 she started a solo career and in 1999 she released her first album. With many upbeat Bahian rhythms and axé, the album received gold and platinum certification. The following year she released, Beat Beleza, which also achieved platinum status.

In 2000 she released the album Festa, whose title track was another success. The single was very popular, and the album got platinum certification. "Festa" was her biggest single up to that point and the video received huge airplay. "Festa" was the most popular song of 2001 in Brazil. Its music video featured 20 cameo appearances by Brazilian celebrities. In 2002, she released the album Se Eu Não te Amasse Tanto Assim (If I Didn't Love You So Much), titled after her big hit that reached the first position in the singles chart. The album, which features a duet with American singer Brian McKnight, didn't sell as much as her previous albums, but was still a hit. Following Se Eu Não te Amasse Tanto Assim, she released Clube Carnavalesco Innocentes Em Progresso in 2003. It was the lowest-selling solo album of her career but it still managed to receive gold certification.

2003–2008: Career consolidation

MTV Ao Vivo Ivete Sangalo MTV Live: Ivete Sangalo (2004), was a live album and included her biggest hits, few released on a live album before, and some Banda Eva hits. The album earned huge sales, most of them because of the single "Sorte Grande", which was renamed "Poeira" by the public and became a big hit in parties, on the radio and also at soccer stadiums (where it was used to cheer the soccer teams). The song received heavy airplay in Brazil and it was also included in the soundtrack of Fifa 2005 videogame. The album received diamond certification and was the second best-selling album of 2004. The DVD, which included the concert held at the Fonte Nova stadium, was certified 3x Diamond, sold over 600,000 copies, and is the best-selling musical DVD in Brazil of all time (and the best-selling musical DVD in the world in the second half of 2005).

In 2005, Sangalo was called by Billboard: Brazil's Queen Song, due to the release of their first live DVD "MTV Ao Vivo" released at that time, the album made references to Carmen Miranda in one of his tracks, Miranda lived in the United States during the first half of the 20th century and epitomized Latin sensuality through her numerous Hollywood films. Asked if she intends to repeat Miranda's success, Sangalo said, "It would be too pretentious for me to even dream about that parallel. But I would like to follow [in] the steps of Tom Jobim and Caetano Veloso. They are Brazilian artists who are respected all around the world. For me, that will be more difficult to achieve, because I want to be known for the kind of music I sing-[which] doesn't fit the Brazilian standards foreign audiences are used to. I want people to [respect] my musical style."

Her 2005 album, As Supernovas, received triple platinum certification shortly after its release.  The album was less upbeat than the others and included some songs with a 1970s touch, with the big influence of Brazilian singer Ed Motta. She also included the hit "Soy Loco por ti America", a Gilberto Gil song.  Sangalo's cover would become the theme song of TV Globo's soap opera América, and thanks to the tie-in, the song became very popular. "Quando a Chuva Passar"  was notable for being nominated at the Latin Grammy Awards, an uncommon feature for a non-Spanish-speaking singer. As Supernovas also received diamond certification which consolidated her as the biggest female solo singer in Brazil.

Due to her remarkable appearances on TV, TV Globo, the biggest Brazilian TV station, invited her to host the TV show Estação Globo, which aires about six episodes every year in late December/early January.

On December 16, 2006, she performed in the Maracanã in Rio de Janeiro, where Paul McCartney, Rolling Stones, Kiss, Police, Rush, RBD, and Madonna also performed. She was the first Brazilian act to perform in this stadium since pop phenomenon Sandy & Junior in 2002. The concert was released as a DVD in May 2007. While her last live DVD was an MTV Ao Vivo, this new one was from the Multishow Ao Vivo brand.

Her biggest career hits were "Sorte Grande" (which was renamed "Poeira" and was sung by crowds at soccer games) and "Festa". 
Sangalo has sold more than 7,000,000 CDs copies and more than 1,500,000 DVDs copies.

According to O Globo, Sangalo asks for R$240,000 (US$120,000 per concert) and a percentage of tickets sale, which makes her final paycheck R$350,000 ($275,000), the second highest-paid act in Brazil. (Roberto Carlos is the most expensive, asking R$700,000 per concert). For special concerts, the price may reach R$2 million ($1 million).

Her parallel business include her performances at her "blocos" on Salvador carnival and other performances at trio elétrico in off-season carnivals.  Her commercial deals include such companies as Grendene, Koleston, Danone, Arisco, Panasonic, Bradesco, and Nova Schin beer.

Her Ao Vivo no Maracanã DVD sold 555,000 copies making it the best-selling musical DVD of the year in Brazil and the best-selling musical DVD overall in 2007 for Universal Records, including international acts. In October 2008, she released a children's album with Saulo Fernandes, lead-singer of Banda Eva.

2009–2011: Pode Entrar, motherhood, US tour

In June 2009, the singer released her tenth studio album, Pode Entrar, recorded in a studio set up at her home, in Salvador. The project had Sangalo in a more intimate way, entertaining friends at her house, artists for duets and musical partnerships also acclaimed and unprecedented. It was also released as DVD and includes guest stars such as Maria Bethânia, Carlinhos Brown, Lulu Santos and Marcelo Camelo. The album includes the huge summer hits Cadê Dalila, elected the "song of the Salvador carnival" in 2009, and Na Base do Beijo, which had heavy airplay in the beginning of 2010. Both of them peaked No. 1 in the Brazilian charts. There's also Agora Eu Já Sei, a smash romantic hit that charted No. 2 in the winter of 2009.

On September 8, 2009, it was confirmed that Sangalo would be opening R&B singer-songwriter Beyoncé Knowles' concerts of her I Am... Tour in Brazil, in the cities of São Paulo and Salvador, Bahia. These shows took place in February 2010.

On November 17, 2009, she released a clothing collection through a deal with Lojas Riachuelo, the third biggest retail stores in Brazil.

In early 2010, she was one of the finalists of the "Music" category of Shorty Awards for the best Twitter users.

In April 2010, a new DVD, "Ivete Sangalo Duetos" "Ivete Sangalo duets", in English, was released, with a total of 19 performances with other artists, all of them previously released in her own discography or in the discography of the other artists with whom she sings. This DVD include performances with Alejandro Sanz, Alexandre Pires, Roberto Carlos, Gilberto Gil, Jorge Ben Jor, Zezé Di Camargo & Luciano, among other artists, and managed to peak No. 1 on Brazilian charts by the second week of May 2010.

She was invited by TAM Airlines, which is now one of her sponsors, to perform on a private show to commemorate the entry of the airline in the Star Alliance. This pocket show took place beneath the Pão de Açúcar, in Rio de Janeiro, on May 13, 2010, and was broadcast by Terra Networks.

In Portugal, she was the only artist to perform at the four editions of Rock in Rio festival held in Lisbon. Her debut in the country in the 2004 edition of the festival charmed the Portuguese people and made her famous there. In the 2010 edition, she was one of the most awaited attractions of the opening night on May 21, and performed to an audience of more than 80 thousand people.

The Brazilian star performed at the Madison Square Garden, New York City, where she recorded her third live DVD, on September 4, 2010. There were four guest stars with whom she sang at her NYC's sold-out show: they were Nelly Furtado, Seu Jorge, Juanes and Diego Torres. Newspapers such as New York Times and New York Post published positive reviews of this show. The singer also performed at the American Airlines Arena in Miami on August 28, at the DCU Center in Worcester on September 1 and at the Brazilian Day party in Toronto on September 6. This was her 2010 North American mini tour.

Brazilian media published in the beginning of September 2010 that Ivete Sangalo would go on tour around Brazil with Shakira in 2011. Later, it was known that the agreement would be for her to perform at Shakira's The Pop Festival shows. The contract would have been signed on Saturday, September 4, in New York, the same day of her show on Madison Square Garden. That same week, Sangalo confirmed she quietly married nutritionist Daniel Cady, father of her son Marcelo, after dating for two years.

On Saturday, September 11, the singer made an appearance at Dave Matthews Band's show in Dallas, Texas, where she performed with the band the song "You And Me", in a Portuguese-English version. This performance was also recorded and featured on her live DVD.

The singer also made an appearance at Gigi D'Alessio's show in Rome on Tuesday, September 21. They performed an Italian version of her success "Se eu não te amasse tanto assim" and "Easy", Lionel Richie's cover, that had been previously performed at the Madison Square Garden and the DCU Center.

The Multishow ao Vivo: Ivete Sangalo no Madison Square Garden record was released on December 7, after being broadcast on December 5 at Brazilian cable TV Multishow. On launch day on December 7, the disc had sold over 300,000 copies in its only pre-sale, which earned him a certified Triple Platinum and Gold Record by ABPD. At the end of January, the DVD is leading Brazilian charts for the seventh consecutive week since its debut. Its first single "Acelera Aê (Noite do bem)" also managed to peak No. 1 on Brazilian charts and "Desejo de Amar" was chosen to be the 2011 Carnival's song.

In 2010, Ivete Sangalo joined forces with Avon as a celebrity judge for Avon Voices, Avon's first ever global, online singing talent search for women and songwriting competition for men and women.

2012–present: Real Fantasia 
The art director who works with Madonna, Giovanni Bianco, paused in their holiday in Sardinia (Italy), to work in graphic design from Sangalo's eighth studio album, Real Fantasia, released in October 2012.

In 2015, Sangalo performed at the music festival Rock in Rio USA in Las Vegas.

"I can barely explain how much I am honored to be on that stage, helping to end one of the greatest and most inspiring events, along with the Brazilian Beyoncé. It was amazing", said the singer to the British newspaper "Hull Daily Mail". Ivete not only caught the attention of the British singer - the international press also highlighted the Bahian performance. The CNN site called the singer "megastar". But The Guardian newspaper Ivete defined as 'the most influential woman of Brazil'. An information that drew the attention of the international press was the representative of Ivete, which has no less than 12 million followers on Instagram, for example.

She performed the theme song for the Latin American Spanish and Brazilian Portuguese dubs of the 2017 DuckTales series.

Discography

 Ivete Sangalo (1999)
 Beat Beleza (2000)
 Festa (2002)
 Clube Carnavalesco Inocentes em Progresso (2003)
 MTV Ao Vivo - Ivete Sangalo (2004)
 As Super Novas (2005)
 Multishow ao Vivo: Ivete no Maracanã (2007)
 Veveta e Saulinho - A Casa Amarela (2008)
 Pode Entrar: Multishow Registro (2009)
 Multishow ao Vivo: Ivete Sangalo no Madison Square Garden (2010)
 Ivete, Gil e Caetano (2012)
 Real Fantasia (2012)
 Multishow ao Vivo: Ivete Sangalo 20 Anos (2014)
 Viva Tim Maia! (2015)
 Acústico em Trancoso (2016)
 Live Experience (2019)
 Onda Boa com Ivete (2022)

Filmography

Notable Advertising spokesperson
 Summer's Eve
 Arisco
 Wella Koleston 
 Grendha
 Nova Schin
 Higgfly
 Kopenhagen
 Sagres Beer
 Caboré
 Philips
 Maratá
 Iguatemi Salvador
 Riachuelo (Store)
 Colorama (Nail Polish)
 Fototica
 TAM Airlines
 Chevrolet
 Bombril
 Danone

Awards and nominations

Latin Grammy Award

Multishow Brazilian Music Award

Troféu Imprensa

Melhores do Ano

References

External links
 Official website
 Last.fm

 
1972 births
Living people
21st-century Brazilian women singers
21st-century Brazilian singers
Brazilian actresses
Brazilian people of Italian descent
Brazilian people of Spanish descent
English-language singers from Brazil
Spanish-language singers of Brazil
People from Juazeiro
Brazilian contraltos
Latin Grammy Award winners
Universal Music Latin Entertainment artists
Shorty Award winners
Women in Latin music